Mary Yap Kain Ching is a Malaysian politician and the former Deputy Minister of Higher Education in the Cabinet of Malaysia. She is a member of United Sabah Party (PBS).

Personal life 
Mary was born on 10 March 1951 in Tawau, Crown Colony of North Borneo and spent most of her childhood there before being sent to Kota Kinabalu to live with relatives after Form 3 to continue her studies. She is a devout Christian.

Educational career 
Mary started her career as a lecturer and teacher in the 1970s. She obtained a Bachelor of Arts in English Literature in 1974 from Universiti Malaya on a federal scholarship and a Diploma of Education from the same university the following year. In 1994, she completed her Master of Education (TESOL) from the University of Leeds, Britain. She was the principal of a prestigious private school in Malaysia when she retired in 2007. She was an advisor to the Minister of Education on the Cluster Schools of Excellence Movement from 2007 to 2009. The Southeast Asia Ministers of Education Organisation awarded her the second Lý Chánh Đức Award. She was appointed to the Women's Advisory Council for Sabah as a member and the chair of Education Committee in 2009. Along the same year, she was appointed to the PINTAR Foundation. In 2013, she completed her PhD program. From 2013 to 2015, she was the Deputy Minister of Education. She is the Higher Education Deputy Minister of Malaysia. On 10 November 2017, she opened the Magnetic Resonance Imaging (MRI) Research Centre for the University of Malaysia.

Political career 
Prior to the 2013 general election, she contest the parliamentary seat in her hometown of Tawau and won, subsequently became a Member of Parliament for the town.

Election results

References 

Malaysian Christians
Living people
1951 births
Members of the Dewan Rakyat
Women in Sabah politics
Women members of the Dewan Rakyat
Malaysian women academics
United Sabah Party politicians
Malaysian politicians of Chinese descent